HMS Poneke was a colonial service  designed by Thornycroft & Company for the defence of New Zealand, built at Chiswick in 1883 and shipped to New Zealand.

References

Sources
The New Zealand Maritime Index

 

Defender-class torpedo boats
Ships built in Chiswick
1883 ships
Ships built by John I. Thornycroft & Company